In sporting terminology, a youth system (or youth academy) is a youth investment program within a particular team or league, which develops and nurtures young talent in farm teams, with the vision of using them in the first team in the future if they show enough promise and potential, and to fill up squad numbers in some teams with small budgets. In contrast to most professional sports in the United States where the high school and collegiate system is responsible for developing young sports people, most football and basketball clubs, especially in Europe and Latin America, take responsibility for developing their own players of the future.

Youth academies
Youth systems attached exclusively to one club are often called youth academies. In a youth academy, a club will sign multiple players at a very young age and teach them football skills required to play at that club's level and style of football. Clubs are often restricted to recruiting locally based youngsters, but some larger clubs such as Arsenal, Real Madrid, Manchester United, and Chelsea have recruited foreign talent, leading to the formation of specialist recruiters such as the La Liga Youth Brokerage, which started in 2016.

Many of the larger football clubs in Europe such as Ajax and Feyenoord in the Netherlands, FC Barcelona and Real Madrid in Spain, Benfica, Sporting CP and Porto in Portugal, Manchester United, Liverpool, Arsenal and Chelsea in England, FC Bayern Munich, and Schalke 04 in Germany, among many others, are regarded as having some of the finest youth academies and have produced many players regarded as some of the best in world football. Other clubs such as Brazilian club Grêmio and São Paulo, Espanyol in Spain, Atalanta of Italy, and English clubs Leeds United, Middlesbrough, Watford, Aston Villa, and West Ham United, while not as financially successful as others, have a world class academy. West Ham's youth academy is known as The Academy of Football, and has produced many English talents that have gone on to play with larger clubs in the Premier League.

Another example is lower league clubs who have produced high quality players through the academy and sold them to keep the club running. A prime example of this is Crewe Alexandra who have, under Dario Gradi and his staff, nurtured players into high quality players such as Danny Murphy and Dean Ashton and sold them.

An alternative name for a youth academy is "Centre of Excellence". In English football, these terms have distinct meanings and are licensed and regulated by The Football Association and The Football League.

In 2020, Major League Rugby teams started forming youth academies.

In the Soviet Union, children-youth sports schools were used as youth systems. Financing of the Soviet youth system was conducted by clubs such as Dynamo Kyiv, Spartak Moscow, CSKA Moscow, and other clubs, and also through major industrial Soviet state enterprises such as PA Yuzhmash, Black Sea Shipping Company, Izhevsk Mechanical Plant, and other enterprises.

Youth leagues
While similar to youth academies, youth leagues are built into a club competition rather than an individual club. However, the teams that play in these youth leagues (called farm teams) are generally attached to a larger senior club. The purpose of these leagues is to give young players experience in proper competition against other players that they will most likely end up playing with or against. The Premier League in England is known for having a large youth league attached to its senior clubs. In the forthcoming season the A-League in Australia will begin its own youth league.

Youth leagues are not just exclusive to football (soccer). The Australian Football League (AFL) has a youth league established underneath its senior league with no attachment to any senior club. The players that play in this competition are then chosen to play for senior clubs through the AFL Draft. Basketball clubs in Europe follow the same format as their respective football (soccer) clubs, with youth tournaments in each country, as well as the Euroleague Basketball Next Generation Tournament, where the top 32 Under-18 sides compete for the championship. Minor ice hockey and junior ice hockey serve an identical purpose for ice hockey and the National Hockey League (NHL). To a certain extent, Little League Baseball serves a similar purpose for professional baseball, although the vast majority of development and recruitment comes at the high school level.

The other major professional sports leagues in the United States and Canada except Major League Soccer (MLS) do not have an official youth development system. The National Football League's players are developed predominantly through the educational system, first with high school football and then college football. Basketball players are typically developed and recruited straight out of high school, although the National Basketball Association requires at least one year out of high school to be eligible to play. College basketball is also a source of players for the NBA and other professional leagues.

MLS Next (stylized in all caps) is a system of youth soccer leagues that are managed, organized and controlled by Major League Soccer. It was introduced by the league in 2020. The system was introduced in mid 2020 and will be active for the first time during the 2020–21 season. It is a successor to the U.S. Soccer Development Academy. The system covers the under-13, under-14, under-15, under-16, under-17, and under-19 age groups.

See also
Minor league
Reserve team
Draft (sport)
Cantera

References

Youth sport
Association football terminology
Australian rules football terminology
American football terminology
Association football academies